Alochana Senapati (born 13 June 1989) is an Indian former footballer who played as a defender.

Career
Senapati was born in Aali in the Kendrapara district in Odisha. She represented Sports Hostel Bhubaneswar in state and club tournaments and Odisha women's football team.

Senapati represented India at the 2008 AFC Women's Asian Cup qualification and the 2012 Olympics Qualifiers. She was also a part of the national winning squads which played in the 2010 and 2012 SAFF Women's Championships.

International goals

Honours

India
 SAFF Championship: 2010, 2012

Orissa
 Senior Women's National Football Championship: 2010–11, runner-up: 2007–08
 National Games Gold medal: 2007

References

1989 births
Living people
People from Kendrapara district
Footballers from Odisha
Sportswomen from Odisha
Indian women's footballers
India women's international footballers
India women's youth international footballers
Women's association football defenders